Gaius Cocceius Balbus (fl. 1st century BC) was a Roman politician and military commander who served as suffect consul in 39 BC.

Biography
A member of the Plebeian gens Cocceia, Cocceius Balbus was a supporter of Marcus Antonius. He was probably elected as praetor in 42 BC. In 39 BC, he was appointed suffect consul to replace Lucius Marcius Censorinus.

In around 35 BC, Cocceius Balbus served as either proconsular governor of Macedonia, or as a Legatus in Greece. During his time in Greece, he was acclaimed as Imperator by his troops. He eventually abandoned Marcus Antonius and threw his support behind Octavian after Antonius divorced Octavia the Younger.

Sources
 Broughton, T. Robert S., The Magistrates of the Roman Republic, Vol. II (1951)
 Syme, Ronald, The Roman Revolution (1939)

References

1st-century BC Roman consuls
Balbus, Gaius
Roman Republican praetors
Senators of the Roman Republic
Year of birth unknown
Year of death unknown